Addison M. Fischer is an American businessperson in information technology, a venture capital investor, and a philanthropist in the conservation of the environment.

Education
Fischer holds bachelor's and master's degrees in mathematics from West Virginia University (1966-1972).

Career
His career spans a variety of roles including computer software scientist, cryptologist, entrepreneur, inventor, investor, ecologist, conservationist and philanthropist.

1960s
In 1968, while working for West Virginia University, he created software that amplified the throughput capability of IBM mainframe systems up to 40% (the high speed "Executor").

1970s
In 1973 he created his first high-tech start-up company which in the late 1970s developed the "Top Secret" IBM mainframe security software (this is now owned by Computer Associates).

1980s
In 1980 he was a principal founder of the Community School of Naples (FL), an independent K-12 school and was a trustee from 1980 through 2005.

In 1981 he founded Fischer International Systems Corporation, a communications software provider to the Global 2000, and serves as its Chairman. Current products include TAO and IOF. Retired products include Watchdog (PC security), and EMC2.

In 1981 he became co-owner, together with principal Stanley Druckenmiller, of Duquesne Capital Management until Druckenmiller's retirement in 2010. DCM had 30 consecutive years of positive investment returns averaging 30%.

In the 1980s he became majority owner of RSA Data Security and remained a board member until its merger with Security Dynamics in 1996.

1990s
In 1995 he provided initial seed funding for the creation of Verisign Inc. which quickly attracted strategic partners and additional financing. Verisign became well known as a standard of internet commerce integrity.

In the early 1990s, he co-founded two small private Silicon Valley venture capital firms, Tierra del Oro and Camino del Oro, specializing in high-tech startup companies. These ventures have been incorporated into Zenerji, LLC. He continues as a principal investor in a number of companies, including Audible Magic and Actify.

2000s
In 2005 he established Fischer International Identity, LLC to focus on internet cloud-based security software. He is Chairman.

2010s
In 2011 he was a founding board member of 
Oceans/Five, a role in which he continues. 

In 2019 he joined the board of Tri-Alpha Energy, since renamed TAE Technologies, a company developing aneutronic atomic fusion to provide nuclear energy without radioactive by-products.

Standards work
During the 1980s and 1990s, he was a member of several official ANSI committees that set U.S. standards for commercial computer security (ANSI X9) and electronic commerce (ANSI X12). He addressed the U.S. Congress, by invitation, on several topics, including digital signature standards, proposed FBI digital telephony legislation, and global U.S. competitiveness
.

From 1995 through 1999 he was a member of the Computer Systems Security and Privacy Advisory Board (since renamed the Information Security and Privacy Advisory Board), and was involved in issues ranging from privacy to cyber-warfare.

He holds numerous U.S. and international patents.

Conservation and environment
In addition to business interests, he is actively involved in preserving for future generations our environment, natural resources, health, food supply, and freedom.

In 2000, he organized acquisition of a substantial amount of sensitive primeval Costa Rican rainforest to prevent its destruction by timber and farming interests (www.LasAlturas.com).

From 2003 through 2005 he was a member of the board of the Amazon Conservation Team, a private NGO that works in concert with indigenous South American tribes to protect their ancestral lands.  He serves as a member of their Advisory Board.	

In 2005 he began supporting and working closely with Dr. Jane Goodall, and her worldwide conservation efforts. He has been a board member of the Jane Goodall Institute since 2008 and Vice-Chairman since 2011.

In 2007 he assumed an Advisory Board role in EPIC, the Electronic Privacy Information Center.  Has been a board member since 2011.

In 2008 he founded, with Ms. Cindy Mercer, the not-for-profit Planet Heritage Foundation to provide additional focus on global ecological issues (including forests, oceans, wildlife, and climate), and various other social, health and economic issues. The foundation works by fostering collaboration among other NGOs and governments to tackle the very large issues. The Oceans/Five funding collaborative is one of these.

In May 2009 he was elected as a director of the East West Institute which works to resolve and prevent international conflicts through non-governmental diplomatic channels.

In April 2010, he supported oceanographer Sylvia Earle and the TED Conference's Mission Blue voyage. This brought together in the Galapagos Islands 100 influential world leaders to seek strategic solutions to restoring and protecting the ocean. It was aboard this voyage that Oceans 5 was created.

Awards
1990: Outstanding Paper of the Year, A.M.Fischer, "Electronic Document Authorization"

2000: Received the West Virginia University Eberly College of Arts and Sciences Alumni Recognition Award.

June 2008: Awarded an honorary Doctorate of Science degree from West Virginia University and delivered the commencement address.

June 2009: Awarded the Hero of Privacy Award by the Electronic Privacy Information Center recognizing his efforts to focus attention on emerging civil liberties issues and protecting privacy, the First Amendment, and constitutional values.

2011: Awarded the Philanthropist of the Year award by Wild Aid for his work in Asian Tiger Conservation.

2019: He was honored with the CQR Chairman's Award

by the IEEE Communications Quality and Reliability Technical Committee

References

Year of birth missing (living people)
Living people
Businesspeople in information technology
Private equity and venture capital investors
West Virginia University alumni
American philanthropists
American conservationists